Snakes Downunder Reptile Park and Zoo is a zoo situated in Childers, Queensland, Australia. The zoo features Australian reptiles, amphibians and marsupials as well as meerkats.

Animals

Reptile species

Snakes

 Reticulated python
 Scrub python
 Olive python
 Woma python
 Black-headed python
 Carpet python (three subspecies are kept at the park: northwestern, coastal and jungle)
 Rough-scaled python
 Pygmy python
 Tiger snake
 Fierce snake
 Coastal taipan
 Eastern brown snake
 Mulga snake
 Red-bellied black snake
 Blue-bellied black snake
 Broad-headed snake
 Collett's snake
 Common death adder
 Brown tree snake

Crocodylians

 Saltwater crocodile
 Freshwater crocodile
 American alligator

Lizards

 Komodo dragon
 Perentie
 Lace monitor
 Sand goanna
 Mertens' water monitor
 Pygmy mulga monitor
 Short-tailed pygmy monitor
 Eastern water dragon
 Central bearded dragon
 Frilled lizard
 Eastern blue-tongued lizard
 Shingleback lizard
 Cunningham's spiny-tailed skink

Testudines

 Radiated tortoise
 Eastern long-necked turtle
 Red-bellied short-necked turtle

Other animals
Their amphibian species are the Australian green tree frog and white-lipped tree frog.

Their bird species are emu and hyacinth macaw.

Their mammal species are red kangaroo, eastern grey kangaroo, Lumholtz's tree kangaroo, koala and meerkat.

References

External links

Zoos in Queensland
Tourist attractions in Queensland